Gagaku & Beyond is an album by jazz flautist Herbie Mann featuring shakuhachi player Minoru Muraoka which was recorded in Japan in 1974 but only released on Atlantic Records' subsidiary label, Finnadar, in 1976.

Reception

Allmusic awarded the album 3 stars stating: "Gagaku & Beyond had Mann working in the world music fusion genre with great success long before new age or "world music" were ever marketing catch phrases. ...this is, along with Mann's more soul- and bossa-oriented recordings, one of his most essential works: groundbreaking, heartrendingly beautiful, and full of deep, contemplative soul".

Track listing
 "Shomyo (Monk's Chant)" (Traditional) – 14:23
 "Mauve Over Blues" (Pat Rebillot) – 12:59
 "Kurodabushi (Sake Drinking Song)" (Traditional) – 5:25
 "Etenraku" (Traditional) – 8:50
 "Gagaku and Beyond" (Herbie Mann) – 7:21

Personnel
Herbie Mann – flute 
Pat Rebillot – keyboards 
Sam Brown – guitar
Tony Levin – bass
Steve Gadd  – drums
With:
On tracks 1–3 – Minoru Muraoka and His New Dimension:
Minoru Muraoka – shakuhachi 
Yosei Sato – shō 
Eriko Kuramoto, Harumi Nakamura, Kazuko Tsubamoto – koto 
Somei Sasaki – shamisen 
Kisuku Katada – o-daiko 
Hiromitsu Katada – taiko 
On track 1 – Modern Shomyo Study Group:
Junsen Kitani, Junsho Matsumoto, Kenei Muramatsu, Ryusho Tsurutaka – vocals 
On track 4 – Ono Gagaku Society:
Ryoya Ono – leader 
Goro Ibeke – gaku so 
Akihiko Ue – gaku-biwa
Yoshio Togi – hichiriki
Kiyohiko Yamada – ryūteki
Shigeru Iwanami – shō
Tkashi Ono – shōko
Kiichiro Togi – taiko

References

Herbie Mann albums
Atlantic Records albums
1976 albums